In mathematics, a signalizer functor gives the intersections of a potential subgroup of a finite group  with the centralizers of nontrivial elements of an abelian group. The signalizer functor theorem gives conditions under which a signalizer functor comes from a subgroup. This theorem is needed to prove the so-called "dichotomy" stating that a given nonabelian finite simple group either has local characteristic two, or is of component type. It thus plays a major role in the classification of finite simple groups.

Definition
Let A be a noncyclic elementary abelian p-subgroup of the finite group G. An A-signalizer functor on G or simply a signalizer functor when A and G are clear is a mapping θ from the set of nonidentity elements of A to the set of A-invariant p′-subgroups of G satisfying the following properties:
For every nonidentity , the group  is contained in 
For every nonidentity , we have 

The second condition above is called the balance condition. If the subgroups  are all solvable, then the signalizer functor  itself is said to be solvable.

Solvable signalizer functor theorem
Given  certain additional, relatively mild, assumptions allow one to prove that the subgroup  of  generated by the subgroups  is in fact a -subgroup. The Solvable Signalizer Functor Theorem proved by Glauberman and mentioned above says that this will be the case if  is solvable and  has at least three generators. The theorem also states that under these assumptions,  itself will be solvable.

Using the classification of finite simple groups,  showed that  is a -group without the assumption that  is solvable.

Completeness
The terminology of completeness is often used in discussions of signalizer functors. Let  be a signalizer functor as above, and consider the set И of all -invariant -subgroups  of  satisfying the following condition:
 for all nonidentity 
For example, the subgroups  belong to И by the balance condition. The signalizer functor  is said to be complete if И has a unique maximal element when ordered by containment. If  is complete, and  turns out to be solvable, then  is said to be solvably complete.

Examples of signalizer functors

The simplest signalizer functor used in practice is this:

A few words of caution are needed here. First, note that  as defined above is indeed an -invariant -subgroup of  because  is abelian. However, some additional assumptions are needed to show that this  satisfies the balance condition. One sufficient criterion is that for each nonidentity  the group  is solvable (or -solvable or even -constrained). Verifying the balance condition for this  under this assumption requires a famous lemma, known as Thompson's -lemma.

Coprime action
To obtain a better understanding of signalizer functors, it is essential to know the following general fact about finite groups:
Then

To prove this fact, one uses the Schur–Zassenhaus theorem to show that for each prime  dividing the order of  the group  has an -invariant Sylow -subgroup. This reduces to the case where  is a -group. Then an argument by induction on the order of  reduces the statement further to the case where  is elementary abelian with  acting  irreducibly. This forces the group  to be cyclic, and the result follows.

This is used in both the proof and applications of the Solvable Signalizer Functor Theorem. To begin, notice that it quickly implies the claim that if  is complete, then its completion is the group  defined above.

Normal completion
The completion of a signalizer functor has a "good chance" of being normal in  according to the top of the article. Here, the coprime action fact will be used to motivate this claim. Let  be a complete -signalizer functor on 

Let  be a noncyclic subgroup of  Then the coprime action fact together with the balance condition imply that
.

To see this, observe that because  is B-invariant, we have

The equality above uses the coprime action fact, and the containment uses the balance condition. Now, it is often the case that  satisfies an "equivariance" condition, namely that for each  and nonidentity 

The superscript denotes conjugation by  For example, the mapping  (which is often a signalizer functor!) satisfies this condition. W) is normal in

References

 
 

 

Signalizer functor